The 2013 Ykkönen season began on 29 April 2013 and ended on 5 October 2013. The winning team was directly promoted to the 2014 Veikkausliiga. The bottom two teams were relegated to Kakkonen.

Overview

A total of ten teams will contest in the league, including seven sides from the 2012 season, Haka who was relegated from Veikkausliiga and AC Kajaani and Ilves who promoted from Kakkonen after winning the promotion play-offs.

FC Hämeenlinna and HIFK were relegated from 2012 Ykkönen. RoPS was promoted to the 2013 Veikkausliiga.

Managerial changes

League table

Results

Matches 1–18

Matches 19–27

Statistics
Updated to games played on 29 September 2013.

Top scorers
Source: palloverkko.palloliitto.fi

Monthly awards

See also
 2013 Veikkausliiga
 2013 Kakkonen

References

External links
 Official site 

Ykkönen seasons
2013 in Finnish football leagues
Fin
Fin